Marcia is a female given name of Italian origin, derived from Latin meaning "dedicated to Mars". It is a female form of Marcius. Marcy/Marcie is a short form.

Notable people and characters with this name include:

People 
Queen Marcia, legendary monarch of Britain
Marcia (mistress of Commodus)
Marcia (mother of Trajan)
Marcia (wife of Cato)
Marcia (vestal), Roman Vestal
Marcia Anastasia Christoforides
  Marcia Francis Liles Carroll Cleckler. 
Marcia M. Anderson, first African-American woman to attain major general in the United States Army Reserve
Marcia Andrade Braga, Brazilian military officer and peacekeeper
Marcia Angell
Marcia Ball
Marcia Barrett
Marcia Brown
Marcia Ciol, Brazilian-American statistician
Marcia Clark
Marcia Cross
Marcia Davenport
Marcia Falkender, Baroness Falkender
Marcia Fudge
Marcia Mitzman Gaven
Marcia Griffiths
Marcia Gudereit
Marcia Gay Harden
Marcia Hines, Australian singer
Marcia A. Karrow
Marcia V. Keizs
Marcia Kramer
Marcia Langton
Marcia Layne, British playwright
Marcia Lucas
Marcia MacMillan
Marcia Marx
Marcia Mead, American architect
Marcia Neave
Marcia Pankratz
Marcia Pelham, Countess of Yarborough
Marcia Rodd
Marcia Strassman
Marcia Theophilo
Marcia Trimble
Marcia Wallace
Marcia Yockey

Fictional characters
Marcia Barton in the film The Creature Walks Among Us
Marcia Brady of The Brady Bunch
Marcia Montenegro in telenovela Mariana de la Noche
Marcia of The Outsiders
Marcia Overstrand of the book series Septimus Heap
Marcia, a character from Fire Emblem: Path of Radiance, and its sequel Fire Emblem: Radiant Dawn

See also
Marcia (gens)
Marsha
Marcie
Marzia (given name)
Marcus (name), the male equivalent
Marcius (disambiguation)
Márcio

References 

Latin feminine given names
English feminine given names